Răzvan Bogdan Nichita Patriche, commonly known as Răzvan Patriche, (born 29 April 1986) is a Romanian footballer who plays for Liga II side Dinamo București.

Patriche was the captain of the team and was a member of Romania national under-21 football team.

Career
Patriche played as a youth for Sportul Studenţesc before his debut for the senior team, in 2005, in a Liga I match against FCM Bacău.

Honours
CS Universitatea Craiova
Liga II: 2013–14

External links
 
 

1986 births
Living people
Footballers from Bucharest
Romanian footballers
Liga I players
Liga II players
FC Sportul Studențesc București players
ASA 2013 Târgu Mureș players
CS Universitatea Craiova players
LPS HD Clinceni players
CS Afumați players
FC Dinamo București players
Association football defenders